Zakir Hussain is an Indian actor who appears in Hindi films. He is known for his negative and comic roles. His best-known performances include those of Rashid in Ramgopal Varma's 2005 film Sarkar, Shardul in Sriram Raghavan's 2007 film Johnny Gaddaar and Prakash Rao in Rohit Shetty's Singham Returns .

Early life and background
Zakir Hussain was born and brought up in Jani Khurd, Meerut, Uttar Pradesh. It was during his studies in Delhi that he first got attracted to the world of theatre and cinema. He started out with "small time" theatre, and then joined the Shri Ram Centre for Performing Arts. He then joined the prestigious National School of Drama and graduated in 1993.

Career
Hussain did theatre for a few years and then came to Mumbai to work in television and films. He started out with serials like Firdaus, Kitty Party and Gaatha, and this earned him recognition. Sriram Raghavan's 2004 film Ek Hasina Thi was his first film as actor. Hussain's role in the film was limited to two scenes, but he managed to impress director Ramgopal Varma, who then offered him the role of Rashid in Sarkar. This role of a cold-blooded villain was much appreciated and Hussain received the "New Menace" award at the 2006 Stardust Film Awards.

After Sarkar, Varma cast Hussain in almost every production of his. Hussain's second noteworthy performance was his role of Shardul in another Raghavan film – Johnny Gaddaar. This performance was so well received by audiences that people on the streets started addressing Hussain as Shardul. This was the film that brought him both decent pay cheques as well as fame.

Hussain is also a talented musician – a percussionist as well as singer. However, he is not to be confused with the famous tabla virtuoso Zakir Hussain (born 1951), who starred in the film Heat and Dust.

Filmography

Films

Television 
 X Zone as Inspector (Episode 96)
 Dishayen (2001–2003) as Inspector
 Yudh as Anand Upadhyay (Yudh's college friend, companion, advisor and COO of Shanti Group)
 Darr Sabko Lagta Hai (episode seven)
 Upanishad Ganga' 
 Vedvyas Ke Pote Beechwale - Bapu Dekh Raha Hai''

Web series

References

Further reading
 "Whenever I get hold of a senior actor I make sure I never let him go without answering my questions." – Zakir Hussain
 MAAN GAYE...Zakir Hussain goes comic!

External links
 

Indian male film actors
Living people
Male actors in Hindi cinema
People from Meerut
National School of Drama alumni
Indian male television actors
21st-century Indian male actors
Male actors from Uttar Pradesh
Year of birth missing (living people)